The Piranji River is a river located in the state of Piauí, northeastern Brazil.

See also
List of rivers of Piauí

References
Brazilian Ministry of Transport

Rivers of Piauí